"Powerful" is a song recorded by American electronic music project Major Lazer. It's the second official single off their third studio album, Peace Is the Mission (2015), featuring guest vocals from English singer Ellie Goulding and Jamaican singer Tarrus Riley. The song was initially planned to be the lead single from the album but was scrapped in favor of Lean On.

Composition
The song is described as an "EDM power ballad" and its soul, pop  and R&B nature led the critics to label it as one of the most accessible and radio friendly songs in the album. It was written by Thomas Pentz, Maxime Picard, Clement Picard, Ilsey Juber, Fran Hall and reggae musician Tarrus Riley; the latter is also featured on the track along singer Ellie Goulding. The song is a musical departure from Major Lazer's dancehall-inspired signature sound, having this song dubbed as a ballad by many reporters. Lyrically, the song talks about the protagonist's significant other having 'power' on them, such when they touch there is electricity. It also hints at sex. The chorus of the song was first used in the Major Lazer TV series on FXX a month before the full song was released in the episode "Vampire Weekend".

Music video 
The music video was released on July 23, 2015. It features both Goulding and Riley performing their parts using telekinetic powers and ruining a small diner. The clip's theme is labeled as "supernatural" and was directed by James Slater.

Use in media 
In 2017, the song was used in an advertisement for Emporio Armani's Stronger With You and Because It's You perfumes., and in the 2017 advertising campaign for Unilever's Close-Up toothpaste.
On the November 4, 2019, episode of the reality television singing competition show The Voice, Team Gwen (Stefani) member Jacob "Jake" HaldenVang performed a rock arrangement of the song in a Knockout round, opposing fellow Team Gwen member Royce Lovett, who performed Avicii's "Wake Me Up."  Coaches Kelly Clarkson, John Legend, and Blake Shelton all preferred HaldenVang's performance, and Stefani agreed, naming him the winner of the Knockout and advancing him to the Live Playoffs.  Meanwhile, Lovett was eliminated when Shelton opted not to steal him onto his team (as Clarkson and Legend had already used their steals by that time).

Track listing

Charts

Weekly charts

Year-end charts

Certifications

References

External links
 

2010s ballads
2015 singles
2015 songs
Major Lazer songs
Ellie Goulding songs
Songs written by Diplo
Songs written by Ilsey Juber
Torch songs
Songs written by Fransisca Hall